Ethmia humilis is a moth in the family Depressariidae. It is found in Jamaica.

The ground colour of the forewings is tan with some scarcely discernible slightly darker spots. The ground colour of the hindwings is whitish, slightly tinged with brownish distally.

References

Moths described in 1973
humilis